Docking Priory was a medieval monastic house in Norfolk, England.

References

Monasteries in Norfolk